Pachypsolidae is a family of trematodes belonging to the order Plagiorchiida.

Genera:
 Pachypsolus Looss, 1901

References

Plagiorchiida